Sivasspor women's football is a Turkish women's football team as part of Sivasspor based in Sivas. They were founded in 2021. Called also as Bitexen Sivasspor, the club is sponsored by the securities company Bitexen.

History
In 2021, the Turkish Football Federation appealed to the major clubs of the top-level men's football league of Süper Lig to help improve the women's football in Turkey by founding their women's football sides. Sivasspor wommen's football team was established, and was approved to play in the newky-reconstructed league system of Turkish Women's Football Super League. Club president is Mecnun Otyakmaz, technical director is Nevzat Ercanlı, and the coach is Adem Sarıtaş.

Stadium
The team play their home matches at the Artificial turf pitch of the Sivas Cumhuriyet University's stadium.

Statistics

(1) : Season in progress

Current squad

Head coach: Nevzat Ercanlı

References

Women's football
Women's football clubs in Turkey
Association football clubs established in 2021
Sport in Sivas
2021 establishments in Turkey